John Hunter Nemechek (born June 11, 1997) is an American professional stock car racing driver. He competes full-time in the NASCAR Xfinity Series, driving the No. 20 Toyota Supra for Joe Gibbs Racing and part-time in the NASCAR Craftsman Truck Series, driving the No. 17 Toyota Tundra for TRICON Garage. He is the son of NASCAR driver Joe Nemechek and was the 2012 champion in the Allison Legacy Series.

Early life

Nemechek was born on June 11, 1997, Nemechek is a native of Mooresville, North Carolina; he was named after his uncle, John Nemechek, who had been killed in a racing accident earlier that year in a NASCAR Craftsman Truck Series event at Homestead-Miami Speedway. He was a student at the Davidson Day School in Davidson, North Carolina. Nemechek was born the oldest of three full siblings. Nemechek also has one older half-brother.

Nemechek was the subject of a children's book on racing, Racin' Buddies, written by his father in 2001.

Racing career

Nemechek began his racing career at the age of 5, competing in go-karts, quarter midget cars and in dirt bike competition. He moved up to stock car competition in 2010, competing in the Allison Legacy Series with sponsorship from England Stove Works.

In 2012, Nemechek moved up to late model and super late model competition, competing in the Champion Racing Association Super Series and American Speed Association Midwest Tour; he also competed in the World Series of Asphalt at New Smyrna Speedway during Speedweeks. Nemechek won praise from Sprint Cup Series driver Kyle Busch following a CRA Super Series race in which both drivers competed.

In June 2012, Nemechek won the pole for the Howie Lettow Memorial 150, an ASA Midwest Tour event, at the Milwaukee Mile; he was scheduled to take a driver's education course the following week as he had just passed his fifteenth birthday. He finished 23rd in the event.

After competing in the 2012 Snowball Derby, starting second and finishing tenth, Nemechek won the 2012 Allison Legacy Series championship, winning 15 of the season's 18 races.

In 2013, Nemechek moved to competing in the Southern Super Series as well as in selected races in the NASCAR K&N Pro Series East, starting with the UNOH Battle at the Beach at Daytona International Speedway in February. In late 2013, he made his debut in the Camping World Truck Series, driving the No. 22 Toyota for SWM-NEMCO Racing. He competed in two events, with a best finish of 16th.

In January 2014, Nemechek announced he would be competing in ten Camping World Truck Series events during the 2014 season. After the season ended, he won the 300-lap Snowball Derby.

On September 19, 2015, 16 years to the day his father won his first Cup race, Nemechek won his first Truck Series race at Chicagoland. On November 29, Nemechek has voted the Most Popular Driver for the 2015 season in the Truck Series.

In 2016, Nemechek won in Atlanta. At Canadian Tire Motorsport Park during the 2016 Chevrolet Silverado 250, Nemechek and Cole Custer were battling for the lead when Nemechek bumped Custer which led to Nemechek losing control and intentionally sending both Custer and himself off-road, pinning Custer to the wall. Before the winner was declared, Nemechek was tackled by Custer; Nemechek would be named the winner.

In 2017, Nemechek won back-to-back races at Gateway and Iowa. Nemechek missed the Championship Four after finishing 2nd at Phoenix.

For the 2018 season, Nemechek joined Chip Ganassi Racing to drive the No. 42 NASCAR Xfinity Series car on a part-time basis. He also would continue to run select Camping World Truck Series races for his father's team NEMCO Motorsports. He would win at Martinsville in March. He suffered heartbreaking losses at Chicago and Bristol, after running out of fuel on the final lap in Chicago, handing the win to Brett Moffitt, and suffered fuel pickup issues with 5 laps remaining and a 2-second lead in Bristol, allowing Johnny Sauter to take the lead and eventual win. Nemechek would go on to finish 7th and 3rd in those races, respectively. In his Xfinity Series debut, Nemechek finished an impressive 4th-place finish at Atlanta, though he was involved in an early race wreck involving Elliott Sadler and Cole Custer resulting in Custer's car wrecking. Nemechek followed up the 4th-place run with a 29th-place finish at Auto Club after a tire failure ruined his chances of a good run. His next Xfinity Series races were the four Dash 4 Cash races, where he had one top ten finish at Talladega. On October 20, 2018, after dominating the race and winning stage 2, Nemechek won his first career Xfinity race at Kansas Speedway in the 2018 Kansas Lottery 300.

In 2019, Nemechek signed with GMS Racing for the full Xfinity schedule in the No. 23 Chevrolet. On October 29, 2019, Front Row Motorsports announced that Nemechek would fill in for Matt Tifft in the No. 36 Ford for the final three races of the 2019 Monster Energy NASCAR Cup Series after medical issues forced Tifft from the ride. Nemechek and his father Joe made motorsports history at ISM Raceway in early November 2019 by being the first father-son duo to race in all three main series in one weekend. He finished the 2019 season seventh in points after finishing sixth at Homestead.

On December 12, 2019, Front Row Motorsports announced that Nemechek would replace David Ragan as the driver of the No. 38 Ford for the 2020 season, competing for the 2020 NASCAR Rookie of the Year honors. Nemechek started the season with an 11th-place finish in the 2020 Daytona 500. After a two-month break, four races into the season due to the COVID-19 pandemic, Nemechek would get the first top-10 of his Cup career in the first race in the double-header at Darlington. This would also be the first top-10 for Front Row Motorsports at a track other than Talladega or Daytona since 2016. However, in the second Darlington race, Nemechek would bring out the first two cautions of the night, eventually finishing 35th. Nemechek wouldn't get another top-10 until the GEICO 500 at Talladega, where he would finish eighth.

On November 16, 2020, Nemechek parted ways with Front Row Motorsports. A week later, he signed with Kyle Busch Motorsports for the 2021 Truck Series season. Shortly after the start of the 2021 Xfinity season, Sam Hunt Racing added Nemechek for a part-time schedule. As of the Pocono race, Nemechek has had an exceptional season, recording 5 wins and recording a top 10 for every race, with the exception of the Bristol Dirt Race. After the Knoxville race, Nemechek clinched the regular season's championship.

On June 11, 2021, Joe Gibbs Racing announced that Nemechek will run three races with them in the No. 54 Toyota Supra at Talladega Super Speedway, Texas Motor Speedway, and the season finale at Phoenix Raceway. Nemechek would win at Texas, finish 22nd at Talladega, and 4th at Phoenix.

On July 5, 2022, it was announced that Nemechek would run the main ARCA Menards Series race at Mid-Ohio Sports Car Course in the No. 55 car for Venturini Motorsports in preparation for the Truck Series race there on the same weekend. It was his debut in the series.

On October 18, 2022, it was announced that Nemechek would return to the Cup Series for the race at Homestead-Miami Speedway, filling in for Bubba Wallace in the 23XI Racing No. 45 car after Wallace was suspended for the race after he intentionally retaliated against, crashed and fought Kyle Larson in the previous week's race at Las Vegas. Nemechek actually had a chance to drive that car earlier in the season after Kurt Busch's concussion although 23XI decided to instead put Ty Gibbs in the car despite Nemechek being selected as the team's reserve driver at the start of the season. (Wallace, the driver of the team's No. 23 car, would switch cars with Gibbs during the playoffs to compete for the owners' championship.)

In December, Joe Gibbs Racing announced that Nemechek would pilot the returning No. 20 Toyota Supra full-time for the 2023 season in the Xfinity Series. Nemechek began the 2023 Xfinity season with a second-place finish at Daytona. A week later, he won at Fontana.

Motorsports career results

NASCAR
(key) (Bold – Pole position awarded by time. Italics – Pole position earned by points standings. * – Most laps led.)

Cup Series

Daytona 500

Xfinity Series

Craftsman Truck Series

 Season still in progress
 Ineligible for series points

K&N Pro Series East

ARCA Menards Series
(key) (Bold – Pole position awarded by qualifying time. Italics – Pole position earned by points standings or practice time. * – Most laps led.)

References

External links

 
 
 
 

Living people
1997 births
People from Mooresville, North Carolina
NASCAR drivers
Racing drivers from North Carolina
ARCA Midwest Tour drivers
American people of Czech descent
ARCA Menards Series drivers
Chip Ganassi Racing drivers
Kyle Busch Motorsports drivers
Joe Gibbs Racing drivers
NASCAR Truck Series regular season champions